George Thompson (1895 – after 1928) was an English professional footballer who played as a full back.

Born in Ashington, he began his career with Football League First Division side Burnley and made five league appearances for the club in the 1919–20 season, as the side achieved a second-placed finish in the league. He played no matches in the following season as the Clarets were crowned champions of England, and moved to Rotherham County in the summer of 1921. He spent two seasons in Rotherham, playing a total of 37 league games for the club before transferring to Football League Third Division North outfit Ashington, his hometown club. In three seasons, he played 59 matches in the league before leaving the club at the end of the 1925–26 campaign.

Thompson then spent two seasons in non-league football with Pegswood United, before re-joining Ashington in 1928. In his second spell with the club he made just one league appearance as the side finished bottom of their division, and failed re-election to the league at the end of the 1928–1929 season.

References

1895 births
Year of death unknown
Sportspeople from Ashington
Footballers from Northumberland
English footballers
Association football fullbacks
Burnley F.C. players
Rotherham County F.C. players
Ashington A.F.C. players
English Football League players